Peter Rothe (born 1935) is a German art director who worked designing sets in the German film and television industries. He worked on a number of production by Wolf C. Hartwig's Rapid Film during the 1970s.

Selected filmography
 Countdown to Doomsday (1966)
 Lotus Flowers for Miss Quon (1967)
 Emma Hamilton (1968)
 The Young Tigers of Hong Kong (1969)
 Jailbreak in Hamburg (1971)
 Mädchen, die nach München kommen (1972)
 Love in 3D (1973)
 The Girl from Hong Kong (1973)
 The Hunter of Fall (1974)
 The Mimosa Wants to Blossom Too (1976)
 Women in Hospital (1977)
 The Man in the Rushes (1978)
 Just a Gigolo (1978)
  (1983)
 Moscow on the Hudson (1984)
  (1986)

References

Bibliography 
 Peter Cowie & Derek Elley. World Filmography: 1967. Fairleigh Dickinson University Press, 1977.

External links 
 

1935 births
Living people
German art directors
People from Altenburg